Haludaria is a genus of cyprinids native to freshwater habitats in the Western Ghats of India. Originally the genus was named Dravidia Pethiyagoda, Meegaskumbura & Maduwage, 2012 which is preoccupied by the dipteran genus Dravidia Lehrer, 2010.

Etymology 
The name Haludaria is derived from "Haludar", the name of a Bengali youth and artist who provided the illustrations for Francis Hamilton's (Formerly Buchanan) book on the Ganges River fishes.

Description
Adults are small, typically less than  SL. Both rostral and maxillary barbels are present. Lateral line is complete and has 18–26 pored scales on body. There are one or two broad, black bars on flank, between bases of dorsal and anal fins.

Species
There are currently four recognized species in this genus:
 Haludaria afasciata (Jayaram, 1990)
 Haludaria fasciata (Jerdon, 1849) (Melon barb)
 Haludaria kannikattiensis (Arunachalam & J. A. Johnson, 2003)
 Haludaria melanampyx (F. Day, 1865)

References

 
Taxa named by Rohan Pethiyagoda
Freshwater fish of Asia
Endemic fauna of India